Louisville Collegiate School is a Junior Kindergarten - 12th grade, co-ed independent day school located in the historic Highlands neighborhood of Louisville, Kentucky, United States. Collegiate is a community rich in history, tradition, innovation, and academic excellence. Founded on progressive ideals Collegiate is welcoming, accessible and proud of all of its students who stand out for their exceptional academic preparation, outstanding character, and confident leadership.

History
Louisville Collegiate School opened its doors on September 23, 1915, in a house at 512 West Ormsby Avenue, becoming the first school in Kentucky committed to preparing young women for college. Virginia Perrin Speed (1879–1968) and her husband William Shallcross Speed (1873–1955) were the principal founders and sustainers of the school, and are largely responsible for the school's success

Needing more land to grow, Collegiate moved in 1927 to its current home on Glenmary Avenue in the historic Highlands, just east of downtown Louisville, in what is now the Lower School.

Although the school initially accepted boys in the primary grades, it remained traditionally a girls' school until 1972 when the Lower School became coeducational.

In 1980, Collegiate's Board of Trustees established coeducation in the Upper School. To accommodate the increase in enrollment, Willig Hall was built in 1983 to house the Upper School. The first coed class graduated in 1987.

As part of the school's Master Plan, Collegiate launched a campaign in 2001 to expand its Upper School because of the growth Collegiate was experiencing. Collegiate expanded its Upper School into a 62,500-square-foot (5,810 m2) building that houses 17 classrooms, seven study areas, three science labs and two computer labs. In 2008, Collegiate launched a Junior Kindergarten.

Academics
Louisville Collegiate School has a long tradition of academic excellence and creativity within an exceptionally warm and supportive environment. It is divided into a Lower School (Junior Kindergarten-Grade 4), Middle School (Grades 5-8), and Upper School (Grades 9-12). Each division has its own administrative head and core faculty. Many faculty members teach in more than one division of the school. Louisville Collegiate School is the only Global Online Academy (GOA) member in the state of Kentucky.

Athletics

Sports
Fall sports
Field hockey, Soccer, Golf, and Cross Country.

Winter sports
Basketball, Indoor Track, Squash, and Swimming & Diving.

Spring sports
Crew, Lacrosse, Tennis, and Track & Field.

Fine arts
Lower, Middle and Upper School students fine arts curriculum:
 Visual art (drawing, painting, printmaking, photography, 3D sculpture)
 Vocal music
 Instrumental music
 Drama
 Visiting artists

Notable alumni
 Sallie Bingham (1954), author and playwright
 Tori Murden McClure (1981), first woman to row solo across the Atlantic
 Jane Metcalfe (1979), co-founder of Wired Magazine

References

External links
 Louisville Collegiate School homepage
 Louisville Collegiate School on Flickr

Private schools in Louisville, Kentucky
Private high schools in Kentucky
Private elementary schools in Kentucky
Private middle schools in Kentucky
Educational institutions established in 1915
1915 establishments in Kentucky
High schools in Louisville, Kentucky